A hedge or hedgerow is a line of closely spaced shrubs planted to act as a barrier or boundary. 

Hedgerow may also refer to:

 Hedgerow (weapon), a variant of the Hedgehog anti-submarine mortar used to support amphibious assaults
 All the Rivers ( Gader Chaya, literally: Hedgerow), a 2014 novel written by Dorit Rabinyan
 Hedgerow removal
 Hedgerow Theatre, an historic theatre in Rose Valley, Pennsylvania

See also
Hedge (disambiguation)